Alula Lagoon is a large shallow lagoon in the northeastern Bari region of Somalia. The northernmost point in the country, it is mostly covered with mangroves.

Overview
Facing the Gulf of Aden, the lagoonal mangrove lies behind a barrier island. It is located northeast of Alula, the northernmost town in Somalia. The lagoon is surrounded by mangrove bushes, and appears to correspond with the "large laurel-grove called Acannae" described by the 1st century CE Periplus of the Erythraean Sea.

Rhizophora mucronata and Avicennia marina are the predominant mangrove species found in the lagoon.

References

External links
Monitoring of Mangroves in Somalia (Puntland, Somaliland and South Central Somalia

Mangroves
Geography of Somalia